Malaysian National Laureate (Malay: Sasterawan Negara) are individuals who were awarded the Laureate for their contributions to Malay literature.

List of recipients for the Malaysian National Laureate
 1981 : Kamaludin Muhammad (Keris Mas)
 1982 : Dato' Shahnon Ahmad
 1983 : Datuk Dr. Usman Awang
 1986 : Datuk A. Samad Said
 1988 : Muhammad Dahlan Abdul Biang Andi (Arena Wati)
 1991 : Prof. Dr. Muhammad Haji Salleh
 1993 : Noordin Hassan
 1996 : Datuk Abdullah Hussain
 2001 : Syed Othman bin Syed Omar (S. Othman Kelantan)
 2009 : Dr. Anwar Ridhwan
 2011 : Ahmad Kamal Abdullah
 2013 : Datuk Baharuddin Zainal
 2015 : Datuk Zurinah Hassan (first woman recipient) 
 2019 : Siti Zainon Ismail

References

External links 
 Registry of Malaysian National Laureates from the National Library of Malaysia
 Sasterawan Negara Ke-12

 
Malaysian literary awards